Mario Curletto (13 September 1935 – 22 December 2004) was an Italian fencer. He won a silver medal in the team foil event at the 1960 Summer Olympics.

References

1935 births
2004 deaths
Sportspeople from Livorno
Italian male fencers
Olympic fencers of Italy
Fencers at the 1960 Summer Olympics
Fencers at the 1964 Summer Olympics
Olympic silver medalists for Italy
Olympic medalists in fencing
Medalists at the 1960 Summer Olympics
20th-century Italian people